Lophocalotes ludekingi, called commonly the crested lizard, is a species of lizard in the family Agamidae. The species is endemic to Sumatra, Indonesia.

Etymology
The specific name, ludekingi, is in honor of Dutch physician E.W.A. Ludeking, who collected specimens for the Rijksmuseum van Natuurlijke Historie, Leiden.

Reproduction
L. ludekingi is oviparous.

References

Further reading
Bleeker P (1860). "Reptiliën van Agam ". Natuurkundig Tijdschrift voor Nederlandsch Indië 20: 325-329. (Calotes ludekingi, new species, pp. 326–327). (in Dutch).
Boulenger GA (1887). "Note on some Reptiles from Sumatra described by Bleeker in 1860". Annals and Magazine of Natural History, Fifth Series 20: 152. ("Lophocalotes Luedekingii [sic]", new combination).
Günther A (1872). "On the Reptiles and Amphibians of Borneo". Proceedings of the Zoological Society of London 1872: 586-600 + Plates XXXV–XL. (Lophocalotes interruptus, new species, pp. 593–594 + Plate XXXVII, figure A).
Hallerman J, Orlov N, Ananjeva N (2004). "Notes on distribution and colour pattern of the rare agamid lizard Lophocalotes ludekingii (Bleeker, 1860) in Sumatra (Indonesia)". Salamandra 40 (3–4): 303–306.
de Rooij N (1915). The Reptiles of the Indo-Australian Archipelago. I. Lacertilia, Chelonia, Emydosauria. Leiden: E.J. Brill. xiv + 384 pp. (Lophocalotes ludekingi, pp. 116–117, Figure 51).

Lophocalotes
Reptiles of Indonesia
Endemic fauna of Indonesia
Fauna of Sumatra
Reptiles described in 1860
Taxa named by Pieter Bleeker